Sérgio Milliet da Costa e Silva, generally known as Sérgio Milliet (São Paulo November 20, 1898 – São Paulo November 9, 1966) was a Brazilian writer, painter, poet, 
essayist, literary and art critic, and sociologist.

See also

 List of Brazilian painters

External links
 Milliet, Sérgio in Encyclopaedia Itaú Cultural of Visual Arts

1898 births
1966 deaths
Modern artists
Brazilian literary critics
20th-century Brazilian painters
20th-century Brazilian male artists